Mount Pendragon is a mountain (975 m high)  north-west of Cape Lookout, Elephant Island, in the South Shetland Islands of Antarctica. It was mapped by the UK Joint Services Expedition, 1970-71. The name was applied to this highest mountain on Elephant Island by the United Kingdom Antarctic Place-Names Committee (UK-APC) in 1971 and acknowledges Charles III, then Prince of Wales, as royal patron of the Joint Services Expedition. Pendragon is the ancient title for a Welsh Prince.

References

Pendragon
Elephant Island